William Francisco Luis Arboleda Perea (born 8 June 1990) is a Colombian footballer who plays as a midfielder.

References

1990 births
Living people
People from Buenaventura, Valle del Cauca
Colombian footballers
Colombian expatriate footballers
Association football midfielders
Categoría Primera A players
Categoría Primera B players
Independiente Medellín footballers
Real Cartagena footballers
Club Celaya footballers
América de Cali footballers
Colombian expatriate sportspeople in Mexico
Expatriate footballers in Mexico
Sportspeople from Valle del Cauca Department
21st-century Colombian people